Simone Bolelli and Fabio Fognini defeated Pierre-Hugues Herbert and Nicolas Mahut in the final, 6–4, 6–4, to win the men's doubles tennis title at the 2015 Australian Open. Bolelli and Fognini's victory earned them their first Grand Slam doubles title and their third title overall as a pair. They became the first all-Italian team to win a Grand Slam since Nicola Pietrangeli and Orlando Sirola at the 1959 French Open.

Łukasz Kubot and Robert Lindstedt were the defending champions, but chose not to participate together. Kubot teamed up with Jérémy Chardy, but lost in the second round to Alex Bolt and Andrew Whittington. Lindstedt played alongside Marcin Matkowski, but lost in the second round to Jonathan Erlich and Treat Huey.

Seeds

Draw

Finals

Top half

Section 1

Section 2

Bottom half

Section 3

Section 4

References

Draw

External links
 2015 Australian Open – Men's draws and results at the International Tennis Federation

Men's Doubles
Australian Open (tennis) by year – Men's doubles